Gholamreza Baghabadi (born 26 May 1958 in Tabriz, Iran) is a retired Iranian professional football player and coach. He was also interim manager of Tractor Sazi from 19 to 28 January 2014 after the resignation of Majid Jalali. He is assistant manager of Foolad Khuzestan in Persian Gulf Pro League.

Statistics

References

1958 births
Living people
Iranian footballers
Iran international footballers
Sportspeople from Tabriz
Machine Sazi F.C. players
Saipa F.C. players
Association football defenders